The Crisis Response Operation Core (CROC) is a flagship European Union defence project under development as part of Permanent Structured Cooperation (PESCO). CROC will contribute to the creation of a "full spectrum force package" to speed up provision of military forces and the EU's crisis management capabilities.Project outlines

Mission 
Rather than creating a standing force, the project involves creating a concrete catalogue of military force elements that would speed up the establishment of a force when the EU decides to launch an operation. It is land-focused and aims to generate a force of 60,000 troops from the contributing states alone. While it does not establish any form of "European army", it foresees a deployable, interoperable force under a single command.

Notable partners 
Germany is leading the project, but France is also heavily involved as the subject is tied to President Emmanuel Macron's proposal to create a standing intervention force. France views this  project as an example of what the Permanent Structured Cooperation (PESCO) is all about.

As of September 2021, Cyprus, France, Germany, Greece, Italy, and Spain are participating in CROC, and other member states could join.

Core participating states

Observers

See also
 European Union Military Staff
 Military Planning and Conduct Capability
 Permanent Structured Cooperation

References

Permanent Structured Cooperation projects